The 1st Battalion, 503rd Infantry Regiment (1–503rd IR) is an active duty airborne infantry battalion in the United States Army, assigned to the 173rd Airborne Brigade Combat Team and stationed in Vicenza, Italy. The battalion has served with the 2nd Infantry Division, the 11th Airborne Division, the 24th Infantry Division, the 82nd Airborne Division, and the 173rd Airborne Brigade; has been stationed in Korea, Italy and the United States; and earned campaign credits in World War II, the Vietnam War, Operation Enduring Freedom-Afghanistan, and Operation Iraqi Freedom.

History
The lineage of Company A, 503rd AIR, was reorganized and redesignated on 1 March 1957 as Headquarters and Headquarters Company, 1st Airborne Battle Group, 503rd Infantry, and remained assigned to the 11th Airborne Division (organic elements concurrently constituted and activated).

On 1 July 1958 the 1st ABG, 503rd Infantry was relieved from assignment to the 11th Airborne Division and assigned to the 24th Infantry Division when the 11th was reflagged as the 24th. The battle group's stay was short, and on 7 January 1959 it was relieved from assignment to the 24th Infantry Division and assigned to the 82nd Airborne Division.

The 1st ABG, 503rd Inf remained with the 82nd Airborne Division until 26 March 1963, when it was relieved from assignment to the 82nd and joined 2–503rd in its assignment to the 173rd Airborne Brigade. Shortly thereafter, on 25 June 1963, it was reorganized and redesignated as the 1st Battalion (Airborne), 503rd Infantry.

Lineage and honors

Lineage
 Constituted 14 March 1941 in the Army of the United States as Company A, 503rd Parachute Battalion
 Activated 22 August 1941 at Fort Benning, Georgia
 Consolidated 24 February 1942 with Company A, 503rd Parachute Infantry (concurrently constituted in the Army of the United States), and consolidated unit designated as Company A, 503rrd Parachute Infantry
 Inactivated 24 December 1945 at Camp Anza, California
 Redesignated 1 February 1951 as Company A, 503rd Airborne Infantry, an element of the 11th Airborne Division, and allotted to the Regular Army
 Activated 2 March 1951 at Fort Campbell, Kentucky
 Reorganized and redesignated 1 March 1957 as Headquarters and Headquarters Company, 1st Airborne Battle Group, 503rd Infantry, and remained assigned to the 11th Airborne Division (organic elements concurrently constituted and activated)
 Relieved 1 July 1958 from assignment to the 11th Airborne Division and assigned to the 24th Infantry Division
 Relieved 7 January 1959 from assignment to the 24th Infantry Division and assigned to the 82nd Airborne Division
 Relieved 26 March 1963 from assignment to the 82d Airborne Division and assigned to the 173rd Airborne Brigade
 Reorganized and redesignated 25 June 1963 as the 1st Battalion, 503rd Infantry
 Relieved 14 January 1972 from assignment to the 173rd Airborne Brigade and assigned to the 101st Airborne Division
 Inactivated 16 November 1984 at Fort Campbell, Kentucky, and relieved from assignment to the 101st Airborne Division
 Assigned 16 December 1986 to the 2nd Infantry Division and activated in Korea
 Redesignated 1 October 2005 as the 1st Battalion, 503rd Infantry Regiment
 Inactivated 15 November 2005 at Fort Carson, Colorado, and relieved from assignment to the 2nd Infantry Division
 Assigned 15 June 2006 to the 173rd Airborne Brigade and activated in Italy
(173d Airborne Brigade redesignated 16 September 2006 as the 173d Airborne Brigade Combat Team)

Campaign participation credit
 World War II: New Guinea; Leyte; Luzon (with arrowhead); Southern Philippines
 Vietnam: Defense; Counteroffensive; Counteroffensive, Phase II; Counteroffensive, Phase III; Tet Counteroffensive; Counteroffensive, Phase IV; Counteroffensive, Phase V; Counteroffensive, Phase VI; Tet 69/Counteroffensive; Summer-Fall 1969; Winter-Spring 1970; Sanctuary Counteroffensive; Counteroffensive, Phase VII
 War on Terrorism: Campaigns to be determined
 Afghanistan: Consolidation I, Consolidation II, Consolidation III, Transition I
 Iraq: Iraqi Governance

Note: The published Army lineage shows War on Terrorism "Campaigns to be determined". Comparison of the battalion's deployment dates with the War on Terrorism campaigns estimates that the battalion will be credited with participation in the six campaigns listed.

Decorations
 Presidential Unit Citation (Army), Streamer embroidered CORREGIDOR
 Presidential Unit Citation (Army), Streamer embroidered BIEN HOA
 Presidential Unit Citation (Army), Streamer embroidered DAK TO
 Naval Unit Commendation, Streamer embroidered IRAQ 2004-2005
 Valorous Unit Award, Streamer embroidered PAKTIKA PROVINCE 2007–2008
 Meritorious Unit Commendation (Army), Streamer embroidered VIETNAM 1965–1967
 Meritorious Unit Commendation (Army), Streamer embroidered AFGHANISTAN 2009–2010
 Philippine Presidential Unit Citation, Streamer embroidered 17 OCTOBER 1944 TO 4 JULY 1945
 Republic of Vietnam Cross of Gallantry with Palm, Streamer embroidered VIETNAM 1965–1970
 Republic of Vietnam Civil Action Honor Medal, First Class, Streamer embroidered VIETNAM 1969–1971
Company B additionally entitled to:
Meritorious Unit Commendation (Army), Streamer embroidered AFGHANISTAN MAY 2007-JUL 2008

Heraldry

Distinctive unit insignia
503rd Infantry Distinctive Unit Insignia

Coat of arms
503rd Infantry Coat of Arms

References

External links
  Official Unit Web Page
  Official Unit Facebook Page
  503rd Parachute Regimental Combat Team Web Page
  The Roving Historian Blog: The 503rd Parachut Infantry Regiment Article

Infantry battalions of the United States Army